The 2018–19 season is Indian Arrows' 5th competitive season in the top-flight of Indian football, I-league. Indian Arrows was formed in 2010 on the behest on then Indian team coach, Bob Houghton, with the main goal of nurturing young talent in India in the hope of qualifying for 2018 FIFA World Cup in Russia. It was disbanded by AIFF in 2013 when their club sponsor, Pailan Group, could not financially support the group. But revived again in 2017-18 season immediately after FIFA U-17 World Cup.

It was revived again for 2017–18 season and fielded the team in 2017-18 I-League after the successful hosting of 2017 FIFA U-17 World Cup to give more game time to U-17 world cup players and best talent from U-19 players who recently played in 2018 AFC U-19 Championship qualification.
They played in Goa and Delhi as their home grounds.

Indian Arrows ended their I-League campaign on 27 February 2018 finishing last in the league but will not be relegated since it was formed as development side by AIFF. They got selected for qualifying match of 2018 Indian Super Cup but were eliminated losing to Mumbai City.

They finished 8th among 11 clubs in I-League 2018-19 season winning 6 games, drawing 3 and losing the rest 19. They scored 11 goals conceding 28. Although after their I-League season, they were successful in reaching Super Cup 2019 edition's round of 16 defeating Kerala Blasters by 2-0 margin. They got knocked out by eventual Champions FC Goa by 3-0 margin.

Coaching staff

Squad information
Indian Arrows project was reinstated after 3 years. On 28 November 2017, AIFF announced squad for this season, consisting mostly of U-17 World-Cup players and some U-19 national players. This is considered as development squad for young and upcoming talent in India.

First-team squad
{|class="wikitable" style="text-align:center; font-size:90%; width:80%;"
|-
!style="background:#034694; color:white; text-align:center;"|No.
!style="background:#034694; color:white; text-align:center;"|Name
!style="background:#034694; color:white; text-align:center;"|Nationality
!style="background:#034694; color:white; text-align:center;"|Date of Birth (Age)
|-
!colspan=5 text-align:center;"|Goalkeepers
|-
|20
|Prabhsukhan Singh Gill
|
|
|-
|31
|Lovepreet Singh
|
|
|-
|32
|Lalbiakhlua Jongte
|
|
|-
|31
|Samik Mitra
|
|
|-
!colspan=5 text-align:center;"|Defenders
|-
|3
|Jitendra Singh
|
|
|-
|4
|Anwar Ali
|
|
|-
|5
|Narender Gahlot
|
|
|-
|12
|Akash Mishra
|
|
|-
|13
|Dalbir Singh
|
|
|-
|18
|Shabas Ahammed
|
|
|-
|18
|Ashish Rai
|
|
|-
|19
|Reamsochung Chongompipa Aimol
|
|
|-
|22
|Deepak Tangri
|
|
|-
|26
|Gurkirat Singh
|
|
|-
|36
|Bijay Chhetri
|
|
|-
!colspan=5 text-align:center;"|Midfielders
|-
|2
|Boris Singh Thangjam
|
|
|-
|6
|Suresh Singh Wangjam
|
|
|-
|7
|Ninthoinganba Meetei
|
|
|-
|8
|Amarjit Singh Kiyam (captain)
|
|
|-
|15
|Jeakson Singh Thounaojam
|
|
|-
|16
|Givson Singh
|
|
|-
|17
|Rahul Praveen
|
|
|-
|20
|Harmanpreet Singh
|
|
|-
|21
|Sanjeev Stalin
|
|
|-
|23
|Lalengmawia
|
|
|-
|24
|Vikram Pratap Singh
|
|
|-
|34
|Ricky John Shabong
|
|
|-
|35
|Ridge Demello
|
|
|-
!colspan=5 text-align:center;"|Forwards
|-
|9
|Rahim Ali
|
|
|-
|10
|Abhijit Sarkar
|
|
|-
|11
|Aniket Jadhav
|
|
|-
|24
|Rohit Danu
|
|
|-

Competitions

Overview

I-League

League table

Matches

References

Indian Arrows FC seasons
2018–19 I-League by team